Your Wilderness is the eleventh studio album by British rock band The Pineapple Thief. The album features guest musicians including Gavin Harrison (Porcupine Tree, King Crimson), John Helliwell (Supertramp), and Geoffrey Richardson (Caravan).

Track listing

8 Years Later
8 Years Later is a bonus disc included with the deluxe edition of Your Wilderness. The disc consists of a single 40-minute track seamlessly blending seven songs. It was later released on 21 April 2018 on white vinyl as an exclusive for Record Store Day.

Track listing

Personnel
Band
 Bruce Soord – Vocals, guitar, composition
 Jon Sykes – Bass guitar
 Steve Kitch – Keyboards

Additional musicians
Darran Charles – Guitar
 Gavin Harrison – Drums
 John Helliwell – Clarinet
 Geoffrey Richardson – String arrangements

Production
 Arranged by The Pineapple Thief
 Produced and engineered by Bruce Soord and Steve Kitch
 5.1 mixed by Bruce Soord
 Mastered by Steve Kitch at Audiomaster

Charts

References

2016 albums
The Pineapple Thief albums
Kscope albums